Abu Saleh Mohammad Saeed Dulal (আবু সালেহ মোহাম্মদ সাঈদ (দুলাল)) was a Bangladesh Awami League politician and the former Member of Parliament from Lalmonirhat-3.

Early life
Saeed was born on 30 March 1946. He completed his undergraduate from Bangladesh University of Engineering and Technology.

Career
Saeed was elected to Parliament on 5 January 2014 from Lalmonirhat-3 as a Bangladesh Awami League candidate.

Death
He had died on 21 April 2019.

References

Awami League politicians
1946 births
10th Jatiya Sangsad members
2019 deaths